The Humboldt Redwoods Marathon is held annually in October along the Avenue of the Giants in scenic Humboldt Redwoods State Park in Humboldt County, CA. The course, consisting of two out-and-back legs, is almost entirely under the canopy of towering redwood trees. Half marathon and 5K events are run concurrently. The event, one of four larger annual races organized by the Six Rivers Running Club, was first run in 1978. In 2009, more than 1,000 runners participated.

A sister event, the Avenue of the Giants Marathon, is run in May over the same course.

The Humboldt Redwoods Marathon is a qualifying event for the Boston Marathon.

External links 
Avenue of the Giants Marathon
Humboldt Redwoods Marathon
Six Rivers Running Club

Marathons in California
Marathons in the United States
Tourist attractions in Humboldt County, California
Foot races in California
1978 establishments in California
Recurring sporting events established in 1978